Hoploscopa anamesa is a moth in the family Crambidae. It is found on the New Hebrides
and Fiji.

References

Moths described in 1935
Hoploscopini